Maung Khin Min (Danubyu) is a Burmese writer.

Works
He wrote the following books
C¯a pe samuddar¯a n* lak` pac` k¯u´´ khran`´´ : c¯a pe sabho ta r¯a´´ naññ`´´ n¯a c¯a cu / Mon` Khan` Man` (Dhanu phr¯u).
Mran` mā cakā´´ Mran` mācā rup` pumh lvhā
Rhe` rathā´´ nok` rathā´´
Trailing the Zartaka and Yarmayana about A collection of 16 short articles about the dramatic troupe of Buddha's life stories
Cakā´´ pre sabho tarā´´ cakā´´ pro ´atak` paññā
Mran` mā bhāsā cakā´´ paññā rhanH` myā´´ nhanH`´ bhāsā cakā´´ ´amranH`
Cakā´´ Samuddarā, Cāsamuddarā about Burmese literature—History and criticism A compilation of 37 articles by a professor of Myanmar Department, well-known writer for Myanmar literature. The articles are about the Myanmar words and phrases, their meanings and areas of usage, useful for those who wants to study Myanmar literature
Rhe` rathā´´ nok` rathā´´ about Anecdotes on famous Burmese authors who have died. He won Lifelong national literary award for 2013.

References

Burmese writers
Living people
Year of birth missing (living people)